The 2015–16 VCU Rams men's basketball team represented Virginia Commonwealth University during the 2015–16 NCAA Division I men's basketball season. It was the 48th season of the University fielding a men's basketball program. The program was led by Will Wade, who was leading the program for his first season after previously coaching Chattanooga. Wade replaced former head coach, Shaka Smart, who resigned from VCU for the vacancy at Texas.

Led by a core of rising juniors and seniors, including Mo Alie-Cox and Melvin Johnson, the Rams finished the season 25–11, 14–4 in A-10 play to finish tied for the A-10 conference championship. They defeated Massachusetts and Davidson to advance to the championship game of the A-10 tournament where they lost to Saint Joseph's. The Rams receive an at-large bid to the NCAA tournament, making it their sixth-consecutive NCAA Tournament bid. The Rams were a #10 seed in the West Region. They defeated #7 seed Oregon State in the First Round before losing to Oklahoma in the Second Round.

Previous season
The Rams finished the 2014–15 season with a record of 26–10, 12–6 in A-10 play to finish tied for third-place. In the A-10 tournament, the Rams won their first conference tournament championship since 2012 (while members of the Colonial Athletic Association), and their first A-10 title, defeating Dayton in the championship game. The Rams received the conference's automatic bid to the NCAA tournament where they lost in the Second Round to Ohio State.

Offseason

Departures

Incoming Transfers

2015 recruiting class

Roster

Schedule 

|-
!colspan=9 style="background:#; color:#;"| Exhibition

|-
!colspan=9 style="background:#; color:#;"| Non-conference regular season

|-
!colspan=12 style="background:#;"| Atlantic 10 regular season

|-
!colspan=12 style="background:#;"| Atlantic 10 Tournament

|-
!colspan=12 style="background:#;"| NCAA tournament

References 

VCU
VCU Rams men's basketball seasons
VCU Rams men's basketball
VCU Rams men's basketball
VCU